The North Russia intervention, also known as the Northern Russian expedition, the Archangel campaign, and the Murman deployment, was part of the Allied intervention in the Russian Civil War after the October Revolution. The intervention brought about the involvement of foreign troops in the Russian Civil War on the side of the White movement. The movement was ultimately defeated, while the British-led Allied forces withdrew from Northern Russia after fighting a number of defensive actions against the Bolsheviks, such as the Battle of Bolshie Ozerki. The campaign lasted from March 1918, during the final months of World War I, to October 1919.

Reasons behind the campaign

In March 1917, after the abdication of Russian Tsar Nicholas II and the formation of a provisional democratic government in Russia, the U.S. entered World War I. The U.S. government declared war on the German Empire in April (and later upon Austria-Hungary) after learning of the former's attempt to persuade Mexico to join the Central Powers. The Russian Provisional Government, led by Alexander Kerensky, pledged to continue fighting Imperial Germany on the Eastern Front. In return, the U.S. began providing economic and technical support to the Russian provisional government, so they could carry out their military pledge.

The Russian offensive of 18 June 1917 was crushed by a German counteroffensive. The Russian Army was plagued by mutinies and desertions. Allied war materiel still in transit quickly began piling up in warehouses at Arkhangelsk (Archangel) and the ice-free port of Murmansk. Anxious to keep Russia in the war, the Royal Navy established the British North Russia Squadron under Admiral Kemp.

The Bolsheviks, led by Vladimir Lenin, came to power in October 1917 and established the Russian Soviet Federative Socialist Republic. Five months later, they signed the Treaty of Brest-Litovsk with Germany, which formally ended the war on the Eastern Front. This allowed the German army to begin redeploying troops to the Western Front, where the depleted British and French armies had not yet been bolstered by the American Expeditionary Force.

Coincidental with the Treaty, Lenin personally pledged that if the Czechoslovak Legion would stay neutral and leave Russia, they would enjoy safe passage through Siberia on their way to join the Allied forces on the Western Front. However, as the 50,000 members of the Legion made their way along the Trans-Siberian Railroad to Vladivostok, only half had arrived before the agreement broke down and fighting with the Bolsheviks ensued in May 1918. Also worrisome to the Allied Powers was the fact that in April 1918, a division of German troops had landed in Finland, creating fears they might try to capture the Murmansk–Petrograd railroad, the strategic port of Murmansk and possibly even the city of Arkhangelsk. It was also feared that large military stores at Archangelsk might fall into unfriendly hands.

Faced with these events, the leaders of the British and French governments decided the western Allied Powers needed to begin a military intervention in North Russia. They had three objectives: they hoped to prevent the Allied war materiel stockpiles in Arkhangelsk from falling into German or Bolshevik hands; to mount an offensive to rescue the Czechoslovak Legion, which was stranded along the Trans-Siberian Railroad and resurrect the Eastern Front; and by defeating the Bolshevik army with the assistance of the Czechoslovak Legion, to expand anti-communist forces drawn from the local citizenry.

Severely short of troops to spare, the British and French requested that US President Woodrow Wilson provide U.S. troops for what was to be called the North Russia campaign, or the Allied intervention in North Russia. In July 1918, against the advice of the US War Department, Wilson agreed to a limited participation in the campaign by a contingent of U.S. Army soldiers of the 339th Infantry Regiment, that was hastily organized into the American North Russia Expeditionary Force, which came to be nicknamed the Polar Bear Expedition.  Under his Aide Memoire, Wilson set the guidelines for American intervention by saying the purpose of American troops in Russia was "to guard military stores which may subsequently be needed by Russian forces and to render such aid as may be acceptable to the Russians in the organization of their own self-defense."

International contingent

Lieutenant General Frederick C. Poole, who had previously spent two years in Russia, was appointed by the British Secretary of State for War, Lord Milner, to lead the expedition to Archangel.

The international force included:

British Empire 

Royal Navy:
a flotilla of over 20 ships including the seaplane carriers  and 
6th Battalion Royal Marine Light Infantry (RMLI),
British Army:
Headquarters elements,
2/10th (Cyclist) Battalion, Royal Scots,
2/7th Battalion, Durham Light Infantry,
548th (Dundee) Army Troops Company, Royal Engineers,
 253rd Company, Machine Gun Corps,
 Canadian Malamute company of experienced sled dogmen 
236th Infantry Brigade,
 17th (Service) Battalion (1st City), King's (Liverpool) Regiment 
 6th (Service) Battalion, Green Howards 
 13th (Service) Battalion, Green Howards
 11th (Service) Battalion (1st South Down), Royal Sussex Regiment

237th Infantry Brigade,
 "Karelian Regiment" of three "columns" of 3680 locally recruited Karelians.
 Two "columns" of Serbian troops amounting to 1120 troops.

238th Infantry Brigade,
 "Finnish Legion" of Red Finns, commanded by British officers. 
 Infantry company from 29th (City of London) Battalion, London Regiment, 
 Two detached sections from 253rd Company, Machine Gun Corps,
 Two detached sections from 548th (Dundee) Army Troops Company, Royal Engineers,
 238th Trench Mortar Battery

52nd Battalion, Manchester Regiment, 
and elements of the Royal Dublin Fusiliers.   
Slavo-British Allied Legion (SBAL): a British-trained and led contingent composed mostly of anti-Bolshevik Russian volunteers (including Dyer's Battalion).
Canadian Field Artillery (67th and 68th Batteries of the 16th Brigade, Canadian Field Artillery)
 
Royal Air Force: 
 
contingent comprising Airco DH.4 bombers, Fairey Campania and Sopwith Baby seaplanes along with a single Sopwith Camel fighter.

1919 reinforcements 
In late May 1919, the British North Russia Relief Force (British Army) arrived to cover the withdrawal of British, US and other anti-Bolshevik forces. It was made up primarily of:
 the 45th Battalion and 46th Battalions, Royal Fusiliers, 
 2nd Battalion, Hampshire Regiment,
 1st Battalion, Oxfordshire and Buckinghamshire Light Infantry.
 two companies of the 201st Battalion, Machine Gun Corps,
 an armed company of the Chinese Labour Corps
 55th Battery, Royal Garrison Artillery
 240th Light Trench Mortar Battery,
 241st Light Trench Mortar Battery,
 250th Signal Company, Royal Engineers
 and the 385th Field Company, Royal Engineers.

United States 

North Russia Expeditionary Force (also known as the Polar Bear Expedition): approximately 5,000 personnel from the US Army, including the:
310th Engineers,
339th Infantry,
337th Field Hospital,
and 337th Ambulance Company.
Also the 167th and 168th Railroad Companies, which were sent to Murmansk to operate the Murmansk to Petrograd line.  US Navy: the cruiser  during August and September 1918 (including 53 personnel attached to British naval units)

France 

 Predominantly the 21st Provisional Colonial Infantry Battalion, a company of ski troops, and engineers. Three artillery batteries (61st, 62nd, 63rd) of the 2nd Colonial Artillery Regiment provided supporting firepower. This was supplemented with a North Russian battalion of the French Foreign Legion composed of anti-Bolshevik Russian volunteers who, like the SBAL, were recruited locally. For their bravery, they were awarded one Distinguished Service Cross (United States) and six Military Medals from the Americans and British respectively.

Italy 
1,350 men in the :it:Corpo di spedizione italiano in Murmania commanded by Colonel Sifola.

Russia 

"White Russian"  forces included the Northern Army (previously the army of Alexander Kerensky's provisional Russian government, led by General Evgenii Miller)

Other countries 

1,000 Serbian and Polish infantry attached to Admiral Kolchak’s forces in the north (as distinct from his Siberian forces, which included the Czechoslovak Legion).
30 Czechoslovak volunteers, part of them serving directly in British Army and part of them detached from the Czechoslovak Legion and attached to British Army.

Opposing forces 

Opposing these international forces were the Bolshevik Sixth and Seventh Red Army, combined in the Northern Front (RSFSR), which was poorly prepared for battle in May 1918.

Landing at Murmansk
The First British involvement in the war was the landing in Murmansk in early March 1918. Ironically, the first British landing in Russia came at the request of a local Soviet council. Fearing a German attack on the town, the Murmansk Soviet requested that the Allies landed troops for protection. Leon Trotsky had ordered the soviet to accept Allied aid after the German invasion of Russia in February–March 1918. 170 British troops arrived on 4 March 1918, the day after the signing of the Treaty of Brest-Litovsk between Germany and the Bolshevik government. 
 
On 2 May, British troops took part in their first military engagement. A party of White Finns who had crossed the border during the Finnish Civil War had captured the Russian town of Pechenga, and it was feared that the Whites would hand over the town to the Germans who would then use the bay as a submarine base. The Germans were the Allies of the White Finns as they had been assisting them militarily during their Civil War. British marines fought alongside Red Guards to capture the area by 10 May with several casualties. In this first engagement, British troops had fought against a White force in support of the Red Army. In the following months, British forces in the area were largely engaged in small battles and skirmishes with White Finns. Command of the British forces in the area was given to Major General Sir Charles Maynard. In late June, 600 British reinforcements arrived. By this time, Soviet–Allied relations were passing from distrust to open hostility. A Bolshevik force was sent to take control of the town up the Murmansk-Petrograd railway, but in a series of skirmishes the Allied forces repelled the attack. This was the first real fighting between the troops of the Allies and the reds. A trainload of Bolshevik troops was also found at Kandalaksha heading north, but Maynard managed to convince them to stop, before Serb reinforcements arrived and took over the train.

In September, the British forces, who had so far mainly only engaged White Finns in small battles and skirmishes, were reinforced by the arrival of a force of 1,200 Italians as well as small Canadian and French battalions. By early Autumn, British forces under Maynard in the Murmansk region were also 6,000 strong. However, on 11 November, the armistice between Germany and the Allies was signed, ending the First World War, meaning that the primary objective of re-establishing the Eastern Front was now irrelevant. However, the British forces did not leave. From this point onwards, the sole objectives of the British were to restore a White government and to remove the Bolsheviks from power.

Landing at Archangelsk

On 2 August 1918, anti-Bolshevik forces, led by Tsarist Captain Georgi Chaplin, staged a coup against the local Soviet government at Archangelsk. British diplomats had traveled to the city in preparation of the invasion, and General Poole had coordinated the coup with Chaplin. Allied warships sailed into the port from the White Sea. There was some resistance at first and Allied ships were fired on, but 1500 French and British troops soon occupied the city. The Northern Region Government was established by Chaplin and popular revolutionary Nikolai Tchaikovsky; to all intents and purposes, however, General Poole ran Archangelsk, declaring martial law and banning the red flag, despite the decision of the Northern Region Government to fly it.

It was reported in the British press in early August that the Allied Powers had occupied Arkhangelsk, although not officially confirmed by the British authorities at the time. By 17 August it was being reported that the Allies had advanced to the shores of Onega Bay.

The lines of communications south from Arkhangelsk were the Northern Dvina in the east, Vaga River, Arkhangelsk Railway, the Onega River in the west, and the Yomtsa River providing a line of communication between the Vaga River and the railway in the centre.

As soon as Archangel had been captured, preparations were made for a push southwards along the Archangel-Vologda railway. An armoured train was commissioned to support the advance, and a battle took place between Allied and Bolshevik armoured trains on 18 August.

During the attack, the RAF provided air support to the advancing Allied infantry, conducting bombing and strafing runs.

On 4 September 1918 the promised American forces arrived. Three battalions of troops, supported by engineers and under the command of Colonel George Stewart, landed in Archangel. This force numbered 4,500 troops. In early September also an RAF squadron was set up specifically for service at Archangel, equipped with obsolete RE8 reconnaissance-bomber aircraft.

Advance along the Northern Dvina
A British River Force of 11 monitors (HMS M33, HMS Fox and others), minesweepers, and Russian gunboats was formed to use the navigable waters at the juncture of the rivers Vaga and Northern Dvina. Some 30 Bolshevik gunboats, mines, and armed motor launches took their toll on the allied forces.

The Allied troops, led by Lionel Sadleir-Jackson, were soon combined with Poles and White Guard forces. Fighting was heavy along both banks of the Northern Dvina. The River Force outflanked the enemy land positions with amphibious assaults led by Royal Marines, together with coordinated artillery support from land and river. Their Lewis guns proved to be an effective weapon, since both sides were only armed with bolt-action rifles.

The 2/10th Royal Scots cleared the triangle between the Dvina and Vaga and took a number of villages and prisoners. The strongly fortified village of Pless could not be attacked frontally, so 'A' Company, less one platoon, attempted a flanking movement through the marshes. The following morning the company reached Kargonin, behind Pless, and the defenders – thinking themselves cut off by a large force – evacuated both villages. The regimental historian describes this as 'a quite remarkable march by predominantly B1 troops'.

In mid-September, Allied troops were driven out of Seletskoe, and it took three days for the settlement to be retaken. By late September, Royal Marines and 2/10th Royal Scots had reached Nijne-Toimski, which proved too strong for the lightly-equipped Allied force. The monitors having withdrawn before the Dvina froze, the force was shelled by Bolshevik gunboats. In early October, the village of Borok was taken but, after a series of Bolshevik attacks were launched on 9 October, the Scots were forced to withdraw from the village. The Scots lost 5 men in their defence of the village. On 27 October, Allied forces were ambushed at Kulika near Topsa, losing at least 27 men killed and dozens wounded, a figure that could have been higher if it had not been for a detachment of Poles who bravely covered the retreat as others panicked. The Allied force withdrew to a defensive line for the winter, first driving off a number of attacks with the help of a Canadian Field Artillery battery, culminating in a very heavy assault on 11 November. An RAF squadron was set up at Bereznik on the bank of the Dvina, equipped with RE8s. Meanwhile, in October fighting between Bolshevik and American and French troops had occurred along the Archangel-Vologda railway. US rail troops worked to repair the trainline so as to allow the advance along the line to continue.

The Allied troops were mainly inactive in the winter of 1918, building blockhouses with only winter patrols sent out.

On the first occasion that White Russian troops were sent into the line of combat during the North Russian campaign, on 11 December 1918, the White Russian troops mutinied. The ringleaders were ordered to be shot by General Ironside.

Increasing conflict with the Bolsheviks and setbacks

Within four months the Allied Powers' gains had shrunk by  along the Northern Dvina and Lake Onega Area as Bolshevik attacks became more sustained. The Bolsheviks launched their largest offensive yet on Armistice Day 1918 along the Northern Divina front, and there was heavy fighting on Armistice Day 1918 at the Battle of Tulgas (Toulgas) at the Kurgomin–Tulgas line: the final defensive line in 1919. Trotsky as Commander in Chief of the Red Army personally supervised this task on the orders of Lenin. 1,000 Red troops attacked the village, and the American and Scots defenders were driven back rapidly. The field hospital was captured and the large defensive gun batteries were threatened, but after heavy hand-to-hand fighting, the Red troops were pushed away from the guns. The Bolshevik force lost as many as 650 men killed, wounded or taken prisoner, whilst the Americans lost three men and seventeen Scots were killed. The Allied forces had managed to quell the Bolshevik offensive by 14 November. When the news came through of the Armistice with Germany, many of the British troops in Archangel eagerly anticipated a quick withdrawal from North Russia, but their hopes were soon dashed.

The Bolsheviks had an advantage in artillery in 1919 and renewed their offensive while the Vaga River was hurriedly evacuated. On 27 January 1919, word was received at Archangel that the Bolsheviks had fired poison gas shells at British positions on the Archangel-Vologda railway. The use of poison gas by the Bolsheviks was soon announced in the British press. The Bolsheviks would use poison gas shells against the British on at least two occasions in North Russia, although their effectiveness was limited.

On the Dvina front, Tulgas was attacked by the Reds on 26 January. The Bolsheviks originally drove back the American and Scots defenders but the following morning saw the Allied forces retake the settlement after a determined counter-attack. The Bolsheviks continued to attack for the next three days until the Allies decided to withdraw, setting fire to the settlement as they evacuated four days later. The Allied troops then reoccupied the town soon after. By early 1919 the Bolshevik attacks along the Dvina were becoming more substantial.

The River Force monitors made a final successful engagement with the Bolshevik gunboats in September 1919. However two monitors, HMS M25 and HMS M27, unable to sail downstream when the river's levels dropped, were scuttled on 16 September 1919 to prevent their capture by Bolshevik forces.

In the Murmansk sector, the British decided that the only way to achieve success in ejecting the Bolsheviks from power was by raising, training and equipping a large White Russian Army. However, recruitment and conscription attempts failed to provide a sizable enough force. It was therefore decided to move south to capture more populated areas from which recruits could be conscripted. During February 1919, as the British fought defensively against attacking Bolshevik forces, the British decided to launch an offensive, aiming to capture extra territory from which locals could be conscripted. This would be the first significant action on the Murmansk front between the Allies and the Bolsheviks. With a force of only 600 men, most of whom were Canadians, the attack was launched in mid-February. Met with stiff opposition, the town of Segeja was captured and half the Red Army garrison was killed, wounded or taken prisoner. A Bolshevik train carrying reinforcements was intentionally derailed when the line was cut, and any escaping men were cut down by machine-gun fire. During the February offensive, the British forces pushed the Red Army beyond Soroko and as far south as Olimpi. Despite an attempted Bolshevik counter-attack, by 20 February 3,000 square miles of territory had been taken.

On 22 September, with the Allied withdrawal already ongoing, a British detachment from the Royal Scots was sent by river to Kandalaksha on four fishing boats to stop sabotage operations carried out by Finnish Bolsheviks against the railway there. The British party was ambushed even before landing and suffered heavy casualties, with 13 men killed and 4 wounded. Consequently, the unopposed Bolsheviks destroyed a number of bridges, delaying the evacuation for a time. One of the fatalities, a Private from Ormesby, Yorkshire, who succumbed to his injuries on 26 September, was the last British servicemen to die in action in Northern Russia.

The furthest advance south on the northern front in early 1919 was an Allied Mission in Shenkursk on the Vaga River and Nizhnyaya Toyma on the Northern Dvina where the strongest Bolshevik positions were encountered. The strategicly important city of Shenkursk was described by British commander Ironside as 'the most important city in North Russia' after Archangel and he was determined to hold the line. However, British and Allied troops were expelled from Shenkursk after an intense battle on 19–20 January 1919, with the Americans losing seventeen men in the process. One American and White Russian force numbering 450 men drove back a Bolshevik force three or four times its size, but suffered some 50 casualties in the process. The battle for Shenkursk took place in -45 degree Celsius temperatures. Over the following days, RAF aircraft flew several bombing and reconnaissance missions to support the withdrawal from Shenkursk. The battle of Shenkursk was a key turning point in the campaign, and the Allied loss put them very much on the back foot for the next few months along the railway and Dvina fronts. On 8 March the Bolsheviks, determined to push the British from their positions on the Vaga, attacked Kitsa. The Reds went as far as using gas shells to bombard the settlement, but all attacks were repulsed. However, with much of the village being destroyed and the Allied force being outnumbered by the enemy, it was decided to withdraw. 
 
On the railway front south of Archangel, the Allied forces were gradually advancing.On 23 March, British and American troops attacked the village of Bolshie Ozerki, but the first wave of attackers were pushed back. Orders were made to resume the attack the next morning, but some of the British troops protested as they had not had a hot meal for some time. Another assault was repulsed on 2 April. The next day, 500 Bolsheviks attacked Shred Mekhrenga but were eventually repelled, with over 100 Red troops being killed despite the British suffering no fatal casualties. Another Bolshevik attack was launched on Seltskoe, but that attack also failed. In total, the Bolsheviks lost 500 men in one day in the two attacks.

Many of the British and foreign troops often refused to fight, and Bolshevik attacks were launched with the belief that some British troops may even defect to their side once their commanders had been killed. The numerous White mutinies demoralised Allied soldiers and affected morale. The Allied forces were affected by their own mutinies, with the British Yorkshire Regiment and Royal Marines rebelling at points as well as American and Canadian forces. In April, a pre-emptive strike against the Bolsheviks was launched against Urosozero. A French armoured train shelled the town and it was then captured with the loss of 50 Bolshevik troops. A major offensive was then launched in May. On 8 May, Allied positions in Karelskaya came under attack, with 8 men being killed. During the advance on Medvezhyegorsk on 15 May, the stubborn Bolshevik defence was only ended with a bayonet charge. British and Bolshevik armoured trains then traded blows as the British attempted to seize control of more of the local railway. The town was finally seized on 21 May, as Italians and French troops pushed forward with the British. The May offensive never quite carried the Allies as far as the largest town in the region, Petrozavodsk.
 
After the May offensive, there was a considerable amount of aerial activity around Lake Onega. The British constructed an airfield at Lumbushi, and seaplanes were brought in to add to the force of 6 R.E.8 planes. The seaplanes bombed Bolshevik vessels, sinking four and causing the capture of three, including an armoured destroyer.
 
In April, public recruiting began at home in Britain for the newly created 'North Russian Relief Force', a voluntary force which had the claimed sole purpose of defending the existing British positions in Russia. By the end of April 3,500 men had enlisted, and they were then sent to North Russia. Public opinion regarding the formation of the force was mixed, with some newspapers being more supportive than others. The relief force eventually arrived in North Russia in late May–June.
 
On 25 April a White Russian battalion mutinied, and, after 300 men went over to the Bolsheviks, they turned and attacked the Allied troops at Tulgas. The Canadian defenders had to withdraw six miles to the next village, where attacks were eventually beaten off after heavy casualties. The capture of Tulgas by the Bolsheviks meant that the Reds now held the left bank of the Dvina 10 miles behind the Allied line. On 30 April the Bolshevik flotilla appeared – 29 river craft – and, together with 5,500 troops, attacked the 550 total Allied troops in three area. Only superior artillery saved the Allied forces, with the river flotilla eventually withdrawing. Tulgas was then eventually recaptured. 
 
In May and June, the units of the original British force which had arrived in Archangel in August and September 1918 finally received orders for home. In early June the French troops were withdrawn and the Royal Marines detachment was also sent home, followed by all Canadian troops after it was requested that they be repatriated. All remaining American troops also left for home. The Serbian troops (perhaps Maynard's best infantry fighters) became unreliable as others withdrew around them. By 3 July, the Italian company was on the verge of mutiny as its men were seriously disaffected with their continued presence in Russia so long after the Armistice. In mid July, the two companies of American railway troops were also withdrawn. The Royal Marines unit had been expressing its dissatisfaction with being forced to stay in Russia after the Armistice since February, and had been openly demanding to their commanding officers that they be sent home. Threatening letters were sent to their officers stating that if they were not repatriated, the men would commandeer the first train going to Murmansk. The men became increasingly unwilling to participate in serious military action throughout 1919. The French and American troops stationed in the north were similarly reluctant to fight, and French troops in Archangel refused to take part in any action that was not merely defensive. During June, small naval battles occurred on Lake Onega between Allied and Bolshevik ships. The Bolshevik forces were completely taken by surprise when British seaplanes emerged and attacked. The settlement of Kartashi was captured during the month. Despite being told when volunteering that they were only to be used for defensive purposes, plans were made in June to use the men of the North Russian Relief Force in a new offensive aimed at capturing the key city of Kotlas and linking up with Kolchak's White forces in Siberia. The villages of Topsa and Troitsa were captured in anticipation of this action, with 150 Bolsheviks being killed and 450 being captured. However, with Kolchak's forces being pushed back rapidly, the Kotlas offensive was cancelled.

In early July 1919 another White unit under British command mutinied and killed its British officers, with 100 men then deserting to the Bolsheviks. Another White mutiny was foiled later in the month by Australian troops. On 20 July, 3,000 White troops in the key city of Onega mutinied and handed over the city to the Bolsheviks. The loss of the city was a significant blow to the Allied forces as it was the only overland route available for the transfer of supplies and men between the Murmansk and Arkhangel theatres, a particularly vital line of communication during the months of the year when the White Sea froze over rendering Arkhangel inaccessible to maritime traffic. This event led to the British losing all remaining trust for the Whites and contributed to the desire to withdraw. Attempts were soon made to retake the city, but in a failed attack in late July the British had to force detachments of White forces to land at gunpoint in the city, since they were adamant that they would not take part in any fighting. On one Allied ship, 5 Bolshevik prisoners captured in battle even managed to temporarily subdue the 200 White Russians on board and take control of the ship with little resistance. Despite the Allied setbacks, a battalion of marines, the 6th Royal Marine Light Infantry, was sent to assist the British at the end of July.

Final offensives 
The final two months on the Dvina front, August and September 1919, would see some of the fiercest fighting between British and Red Army troops of the Civil War. In August, a major offensive was launched along the Dvina to try and strike a blow at Bolshevik morale and to increase the morale of the White forces before a withdrawal. As part of this, an attack was made on the village of Gorodok. Before the attack began, 6 RAF DH.9s, 5 DH.9As and two Sopwith Snipes dropped three tonnes of bombs on the village in two successful raids, and on 10 August British planes also dropped bombs on other Bolshevik held villages. During the attack, 750 Bolshevik prisoners were taken, and one battery was found to have been manned by German troops. The village of Seltso was also attacked, but a strong Bolshevik defence halted any British progress. However, the villages of Kochamika, Jinta, Lipovets and Zaniskaya were captured with little resistance. In total the offensive led to the deaths of around 700 Reds and was considered a success. There was also action on the railway front south of Archangel at this time, and a raid on the settlement of Alenxandrova took place on 19 August. On 24 August, there was an aerial dogfight between a British RE8 aircraft and two Bolshevik Nieuport fighters over the Pinega River, with the British plane only returning safely when the observer flew 100 miles back to base whilst his pilot lay unconscious. On 10 September, the city of Onega was retaken. The American River Force monitors made a final successful engagement with the Bolshevik gunboats in September 1919. However two monitors, HMS M25 and HMS M27, unable to sail downstream when the river's levels dropped, were scuttled on 16 September 1919 to prevent their capture by Bolshevik forces.

A final offensive on the Murmansk front was launched by the Allied forces in September, aimed at destroying the Bolshevik forces to leave the White forces in a good position after the planned withdrawal. On 28 August 1918 the British 6th Royal Marine Light Infantry Battalion was ordered to seize the village of Koikori (Койкары) from the Bolsheviks as part of a wide offensive into East Karelia to secure the British withdrawal to Murmansk. Serbian forces supported the British as they attempted to push on to the Bolshevik village. The attack on the village was disorganized and resulted in three Marines killed and 18 wounded, including the battalion commander who had ineffectually led the attack himself. A week later, B and C companies, led this time by an army major, made a second attempt to take Koikori, while D company was involved in an attack on the village of Ussuna. The British were again repulsed at Koikori; the army major was killed and both Marine company commanders wounded. D company was also beaten off by Bolshevik forces around Ussuna, with the death of the battalion adjutant, killed by sniper fire.

The next morning, faced with the prospect of another attack on the village, one Marine company refused to obey orders and withdrew themselves to a nearby friendly village. As a result, 93 men from the battalion were court-martialled; 13 were sentenced to death and others received substantial sentences of hard labour. In December 1919, the Government, under pressure from several MPs, revoked the sentence of death and considerably reduced the sentences of all the convicted men.

The Serbs and White Russian forces attacked again on 11 and 14 September, but these attacks also failed. However, the British did manage to reach the Nurmis river by 18 September, with 9,000 troops, including 6,000 White Russians, participating in this final offensive.
 
On 6 September, the commanding officer of the 2nd Battalion Hampshire Regiment, Lieutenant Colonel Sherwood-Kelly, published an open letter in the Daily Express lambasting the North Russia campaign, stating that the volunteer British troops were being used for offensive actions (despite being told that they wouldn't be) and that the regional White "puppet" government "rested on no basis of public confidence and support". The letter contributed to the British public and soldiers' desire for a withdrawal from North Russia. During September, a couple of Bolshevik attacks were launched on Bolshie Ozerki, and although the first was repelled, 750 Red troops advanced on the village on 15 September and attacked from all sides, inflicting heavy casualties on the British and Allied defenders. On 22 September, with the Allied withdrawal already ongoing, a British detachment from the Royal Scots was sent by river to Kandalaksha on four fishing boats to stop sabotage operations carried out by Finnish Bolsheviks against the railway there. The British party was ambushed even before landing and suffered heavy casualties, with 13 men killed and 4 wounded. Consequently, the unopposed Bolsheviks destroyed a number of bridges, delaying the evacuation for a time. One of the fatalities, a Private from Ormesby, Yorkshire, who succumbed to his injuries on 26 September, was the last British servicemen to die in action in Northern Russia.

Withdrawal of British troops

An international policy to support the White Russians and, in newly appointed Secretary of State for War Winston Churchill's words, "to strangle at birth the Bolshevik State" became increasingly unpopular in Britain. In January 1919 the Daily Express was echoing public opinion when, paraphrasing Bismarck, it exclaimed, "the frozen plains of Eastern Europe are not worth the bones of a single grenadier".

From April 1919, the inability to hold the flanks and mutinies in the ranks of the White Russian forces caused the Allied Powers to decide to leave. British officers at Shussuga had a lucky escape when their Russian gunners remained loyal. A number of western military advisers were killed by White mutineers who went over to the Bolsheviks. The Bolsheviks had no intention of allowing the British to leave without a fight, and resumed their attacks on the British positions on 6 September. Fighting took place in the villages of Kodema, Ivanovskaya, Puchega and Chudinova, where 81 Reds were killed and 99 taken prisoner. In total, 163 Reds were killed in their offensive compared to one fatality on the side of the British. Over the next week, the Bolsheviks continued attacking the British lines and moved forward very quickly, and there were clashes at Pless and Shushunga. The attackers were subsequently identified as a combined force of civilian partisans and deserters who had mutinied and gone over to the Bolsheviks from the British lines on 7 July. By this point, British troops had started withdrawing to Archangel in order to prepare themselves for the evacuation of North Russia.

The British War Office sent General Henry Rawlinson to North Russia to assume command of the evacuation out of both Archangelsk and Murmansk. General Rawlinson arrived on August 11.

On the morning of September 27, 1919, the last Allied troops departed from Archangelsk, and on October 12, Murmansk was abandoned.

Archangelsk Railway and withdrawal of US troops
Minor operations to keep open a line of withdrawal against the 7th Red Army as far south as Lake Onega and Yomtsa River to the east took place along the Arkhangelsk Railway with an armoured train manned by the Americans. The last major battle fought by the Americans before their departure took place at Bolshie Ozerki from 31 March through 4 April 1919.

The US appointed Brigadier General Wilds P. Richardson as commander of US forces to organize the safe withdrawal from Arkhangelsk.
Richardson and his staff arrived in Archangelsk on April 17, 1919. By the end of June, the majority of the US forces was heading home and by September 1919, the last US soldier of the Expedition had also left Northern Russia.

Aftermath
The White Russian Northern Army was left to face the Red Army alone. Poorly disciplined, they were no match for the Red Army, and quickly collapsed when the Bolsheviks launched a counter-offensive in December 1919.

Many soldiers capitulated and the remnants of the Army were evacuated from Arkhangelsk in February 1920. On February 21, 1920 the Bolsheviks entered Arkhangelsk and on March 13, 1920, they took Murmansk. The White Northern Region Government ceased to exist. White Northern Russian commander Eugene Miller held out to the end, fleeing with a number of other White officers – including Grigory Chaplin – in an icebreaker when the Reds entered Archangel. They fled to France, and Miller was later captured by the Bolsheviks and executed in 1939.

Legacy
In 1927, the Constructivist-styled Monument to the Victims of the Intervention was raised in Murmansk, on the tenth anniversary of the Russian Revolution.

The campaign in fiction
Two fictional television characters fought with the British Expeditionary Force: Jack Ford in When the Boat Comes In (as an intelligence officer in Murmansk) and Albert Steptoe in Steptoe and Son. It also features in the Alexander Fullerton novels Look to the Wolves and Bloody Sunset.  The 1990 film Archangel is a surrealistic drama set in 1919 Archangel during the war.

See also
 American Expeditionary Force Siberia
 Aunus expedition
 Australian contribution to the Allied Intervention in Russia 1918–1919
 British campaign in the Baltic (1918–1919)
 Estonian War of Independence
 Murmansk Legion
 Siberian intervention
 Southern Russia intervention
 Viena expedition

Notes

References

Bibliography

External links
 American Polar Bears , the American Expeditionary Force, North Russia
 Polar Bear Memorial Association
 An account of a Royal Navy trip to North Russia on a hospital ship, June – October 1919
 Foreign Command of US Forces 1900–1993
 Russian Bolshevik Navy 1919_files
 North Russian Expeditionary Force 1919, The Journal and Photographs of Yeoman of Signals George Smith, Royal Navy
 The History of the American Expedition Fighting the Bolsheviki Campaigning in North Russia 1918–1919
 The Evacuation of Northern Russia, 1919 (1920)
 Polar Bear Expedition Digital Collections Housed at the Bentley Historical Library. More than 50 individual collections of primary source material, including diaries, maps, correspondence, photos, ephemera, printed materials, and a film.
 Original movie clip of US Army Allied War in Russia, 1918-22

North Russian Campaign
North Russian Campaign
Allied intervention in the Russian Civil War
North Russian Campaign
North Russian Campaign
Presidency of Woodrow Wilson
Soviet Union–United Kingdom relations
Soviet Union–United States relations
North Russian Campaign
Military in the Arctic
Conflicts in 1918
Conflicts in 1919
1918 in Russia
1919 in Russia
History of the Royal Marines
Murmansk
Arkhangelsk
History of Murmansk Oblast
History of the Republic of Karelia
History of Arkhangelsk Oblast
White movement
1919 in the United States
1918 in the United Kingdom
1919 in the United Kingdom